Altobeli Santos da Silva (born 3 December 1990) is a Brazilian distance runner. He finished ninth in the 3000 m steeplechase at the 2016 Summer Olympics. In 2017, he competed in the men's 3000 metres steeplechase at the 2017 World Athletics Championships held in London, United Kingdom. He competed at the 2020 Summer Olympics.

Da Silva was named after the Italian football striker Alessandro Altobelli. In his early years he earned money by delivering leaflets for a local supermarket. He once entered a 10 km road race aiming to win its top prize, a motorbike, which he needed for his job. He failed to win, but met his future coach Guilherme Salgado.

Personal bests
3000 m steeplechase: 8:23.67 –  Rabat, 16 Jul 2017
5000 m: 13:23.85 –  Palo Alto, 3 May 2018

International competitions

References

External links

Living people
1990 births
People from Catanduva
Brazilian male long-distance runners
Brazilian male steeplechase runners
Pan American Games athletes for Brazil
Athletes (track and field) at the 2015 Pan American Games
Athletes (track and field) at the 2019 Pan American Games
Pan American Games gold medalists for Brazil
Pan American Games silver medalists for Brazil
Pan American Games medalists in athletics (track and field)
Athletes (track and field) at the 2016 Summer Olympics
Olympic athletes of Brazil
World Athletics Championships athletes for Brazil
South American Championships in Athletics winners
Pan American Games gold medalists in athletics (track and field)
Medalists at the 2019 Pan American Games
Ibero-American Championships in Athletics winners
Troféu Brasil de Atletismo winners
Athletes (track and field) at the 2020 Summer Olympics
Sportspeople from São Paulo (state)
20th-century Brazilian people
21st-century Brazilian people